The men's coxed pair competition at the 1992 Summer Olympics took place at Lake of Banyoles, Spain. It was held from 28 July to 2 August. There were 16 boats (49 competitors, with Czechoslovakia making one substitution) from 16 nations, with each nation limited to one boat in the event. The event was won by brothers Greg and Jonny Searle and coxswain Garry Herbert of Great Britain, the nation's first victory in the event. It was the third consecutive Games with brothers winning as the rowers; Italy's Carmine Abbagnale and Giuseppe Abbagnale had won in 1984 and 1988. They, along with longtime cox Giuseppe Di Capua, took silver this year, becoming the only crew to win three medals together in the event (only one other man, Conn Findlay, had earned three medals, with three different rowing partners and two different coxswains). Bronze went to Romanians Dimitrie Popescu, Nicolae Țaga, and cox Dumitru Răducanu. Popescu and Răducanu had been on the 1984 silver medal team, making them the 16th and 17th—and final—men to earn multiple medals in the event.

Background

This was the 18th and final appearance of the event. Rowing had been on the programme in 1896 but was cancelled due to bad weather. The men's coxed pair was one of the original four events in 1900, but was not held in 1904, 1908, or 1912. It returned to the programme after World War I and was held every Games from 1924 to 1992, when it (along with the men's coxed four) was replaced with the men's lightweight double sculls and men's lightweight coxless four.

Five of the 18 competitors from the 1988 coxed pair Final A returned: the two-time reigning champions Carmine Abbagnale, Giuseppe Abbagnale, and Giuseppe Di Capua of Italy; fourth-place rower Dimitrie Popescu of Romania, reunited with his 1984 silver-medal teammate coxswain Dumitru Răducanu; and fifth-place cox Stefan Stoykov of Bulgaria. The Italian crew was exceptionally consistent (having rowed together for three full Olympic cycles) and was an overwhelming favourite, with four consecutive World Championships (and 7 of 9 starting in 1981, with silver and bronze in the other two years) along with their two Olympic golds.

Lithuania made its debut in the event, while some other former Soviet republics competed as the Unified Team. The United States made its 15th appearance, most among nations.

Competition format

The coxed pair event featured three-person boats, with two rowers and a coxswain. It was a sweep rowing event, with the rowers each having one oar (and thus each rowing on one side). The course used the 2000 metres distance that became the Olympic standard in 1912.

The competition consisted of three main rounds (quarterfinals, semifinals, and finals) as well as a repechage. The 16 boats were divided into three heats for the first round, with 5 or 6 boats in each heat. The winner of each heat (3 boats total) advanced directly to the semifinals. The remaining 13 boats were placed in the repechage. The repechage featured three heats, with 4 or 5 boats in each heat. The top three boats in each repechage heat (9 boats total) advanced to the semifinals. The remaining 4 boats in the repechage (4th and 5th placers) were placed in the "C" final to compete for 13th through 16th places.

The 12 semifinalist boats were divided into two heats of 6 boats each. The top three boats in each semifinal (6 boats total) advanced to the "A" final to compete for medals and 4th through 6th place; the bottom three boats in each semifinal were sent to the "B" final for 7th through 12th.

Schedule

All times are Central European Summer Time (UTC+2)

Results

Quarterfinals

Quarterfinal 1

Quarterfinal 2

Quarterfinal 3

Repechage

Repechage heat 1

Repechage heat 2

Repechage heat 3

Semifinals

Semifinal 1

Semifinal 2

Finals

Final C

Final B

Final A

Final classification

The following rowers took part:

References

Rowing at the 1992 Summer Olympics
Men's events at the 1992 Summer Olympics